The  was the sixth annual professional wrestling single-elimination tournament promoted by World Wonder Ring Stardom in Tokyo, Japan. The event took place on March 24, 2020, with a limited attendance due in part to the ongoing COVID-19 pandemic at the time.

Storylines
The show featured thirteen Cinderella Tournament  matches and a dark match with scripted storylines, where wrestlers portray villains, heroes, or less distinguishable characters in the scripted events that built tension and culminate in a wrestling match or series of matches. The matches can be won by pinfall, submission or elimination over the top rope. A time-limit draw or a double elimination means a loss for each competitor.

Event
The first-round matches were broadcast live on Stardom's YouTube channel. The preshow included a dark match in which Sumire Natsu and Hina defeated Itsuki Hoshino and Rina. The tournament had two draws, one between Utami Hayashishita and Maika, and the other one between Hana Kimura and Mayu Iwatani, therefore Tam Nakano and Natsuko Tora received walkover victories straight through the semi-finals. Giulia won the Cinderella Tournament, with her granted wish being a match for the Wonder of Stardom Championship against the then-time champion Arisa Hoshiki. However, Hoshiki retired from professional wrestling on May 20, 2020, leaving Giulia to challenge for the vacant title against Tam Nakano.

Participants
The tournament was composed by 16 competitors including the champions. It was the last event to conclude in a single day.

*Noted underneath are the champions who held their titles at the time of the tournament.
{| class="wikitable sortable" align="left center" 
|-
!Wrestler
!Unit
!Notes
|-
|AZM
|Queen's Quest
|
|-style="background: gold"
|Giulia
|Donna Del Mondo
|WinnerArtist of Stardom Champion
|-
|Hana Kimura
|Tokyo Cyber Squad
|
|-
|Jamie Hayter
|Oedo Tai
|Goddess of Stardom ChampionSWA World Champion
|-
|Jungle Kyona
|Tokyo Cyber Squad
|
|-
|Konami
|Tokyo Cyber Squad
|
|-
|Maika
|Donna Del Mondo
|Artist of Stardom ChampionFuture of Stardom Champion
|-
|Mayu Iwatani
|Stars
|World of Stardom Champion
|-
|Momo Watanabe
|Queen's Quest
|
|-
|Natsuko Tora
|Oedo Tai
|
|-
|Saki Kashima
|Oedo Tai
|
|-
|Saya Kamitani
|Queen's Quest
|
|-
|Starlight Kid
|Stars
|
|-
|Syuri
|Donna Del Mondo
|Artist of Stardom Champion
|-
|Tam Nakano
|Stars
|
|-
|Utami Hayashishita
|Queen's Quest
|

Brackets

Notes

References

External links
Page Stardom World

2020 in professional wrestling
2020 in Tokyo
Women's professional wrestling shows
World Wonder Ring Stardom shows
World Wonder Ring Stardom
Professional wrestling in Tokyo